Bayezit Bikbay (full name Bayezit Gayazovich Bikbay; 9 January 1909 – 2 September 1968), was a Russian and Soviet poet, writer and playwright.

Life and career
Bayazit Bikbay was born in 1909. In 1932, he published his first collection of poems, titled Current days. He subsequently published Beyond the Forest, Bright Land, and The Libretto, which was based on stories of the life of Bashkir national hero Salawat Yulayev. In 1937 Bikbay performed the drama "Karlugas" for the first time. He also published many one-act plays.

During World War II, Bikbay was unable to serve along the Eastern Front for health reasons. Instead, he published poetry and plays, often incorporating military themes into his collections. During this time, Bikbay published I Praise the Earth, Fire Line, Homeland Calling (Watan Saҡyra, 1943) and Children of the Same Family (Ber Tuғandar, 1944).

Over the course of his career, Bikbay wrote more than forty books, poetry collections, essays, short stories, plays, and libretti. including the novel, When Bottled Akselyan. He also translated the classic Russian literature of Tolstoy, Turgenev and Gorky.

1909 births
1968 deaths
Recipients of the Order of the Red Banner of Labour
Bashkir poets
Bashkir-language poets
Socialist realism writers
Soviet poets
Tatar writers
20th-century pseudonymous writers
People from Kuyurgazinsky District